The Lost Road and Other Writings – Language and Legend before 'The Lord of the Rings' is the fifth volume of The History of Middle-earth, a series of compilations of drafts and essays written by J. R. R. Tolkien in around 1936–1937. It was edited and published posthumously in 1987 by Christopher Tolkien.

Book

Inscription 

The title page of each volume of The History of Middle-earth has an inscription in Tengwar, written by Christopher Tolkien and describing the contents of the book. The inscription in Volume V reads "Herein are collected the oldest Tale of the Downfall of Númenor, the story of the Lost Road into the West, the Annals of Valinor and the Annals of Beleriand in a later form, the Ainulindalë, or Music of the Ainur, the Lhammas, or Account of Tongues, the Quenta Silmarillion or History of the Silmarils, and the history of many words and names."

Contents 

The Lost Road and Other Writings contains the following pieces:

 The Early History of the Legend — an introduction to the following two pieces, detailing how Tolkien's correspondence with C. S. Lewis led to the writing of The Lost Road.
 The Fall of Númenor — an early draft of what would become the Akallabêth.
 The Lost Road — an unfinished time-travel story written in late 1936 that connects Tolkien's other tales to the 20th century.
 The later Annals of Beleriand.
 The later Annals of Valinor.
 The Ainulindalë — an early version of the Ainulindalë (the Music of the Ainur).
 The Lhammas ("Account of Tongues") — an overview of the various languages of Middle-earth.
 Quenta Silmarillion — a draft of the Quenta Silmarillion.
 The Etymologies — an etymological dictionary of the Elvish tongues, contemporary with writings up to that time.
 Appendix
 The Genealogies
 The List of Names
 The Second Silmarillion Map

Approach

The Lost Road itself was the result of a joint decision by Tolkien and C. S. Lewis to make attempts at writing science fiction. Lewis ended up writing a story about space travel, which eventually became The Space Trilogy, and Tolkien tried to write something about time travel, but never completed it. The Lost Road is a fragmentary beginning of a tale, with a rough outline and several pieces of narrative, including four chapters dealing with modern England and Númenor, from which the entire story may be glimpsed. The scheme was for time travel by means of "vision" or being mentally inserted into what had been so as to experience that which had happened. In this way the tale links the 20th century first to the Saxon England of Alfred the Great, then to the Lombard king Alboin of St Benedict's time, the Baltic Sea during the Viking Age, Ireland at the time of the Tuatha Dé Danann's coming (600 years after Noah's Flood), the prehistoric North in the Ice Age, a "Galdor story" of Middle-earth in the Third Age, and finally the Fall of Gil-galad, before recounting the prime legend of the Downfall of Númenor and the Bending of the World.

The story starts with Alboin, a child in 20th century Britain who has strange visions referencing the First and Second Ages of Middle-Earth after talking to his father Oswin about his 6th century namesake, where he sees the clouds coming westwards over the Atlantic as resembling the great eagles of Manwë traveling to Númenor. Many years later as an adult, the dreams return to him as he starts to realize that they are actual memories from his ancestors, which he wishes he could see for himself. Fulfilling this wish, Elendil appears to him in another one of his dreams, offering to take him and his son Audoin to some time from the 3260s to the 3310s of the Second Age, which he accepts. The view of the distant past begins with Elendil having a conversation with one of his unspecified sons on the shores of Númenor discussing the state of the kingdom. Elendil reveals to his son Herendil that he is a member of the faithful who still support the Valar, trying to convince him of Sauron's corruption and negative influence over the king Tarkalion (Ar-Pharazôn). Herendil argues that Sauron has enlightened the Númenorians after his imprisonment and ascension to being the king's advisor, portraying the Valar as villains for keeping immortality from the species of men. 

Elendil tells him the true history of Arda up until that point where mortality was a gift rather than a curse, and discusses how militaristic Númenor is becoming despite not having any enemies to foreshadow the attempted invasion of Aman. However, once Herendil agrees to join the rebellion against Sauron in the safety of their house, the story is discontinued with the conclusion of the fourth chapter. The novel explores the theme of the "Straight Road" into the West, now open only in memory because the world has become round.

Tolkien reworked and expanded some of the ideas in The Lost Road in The Notion Club Papers, which was also left unfinished.

References

External links
More in-depth information on The Lost Road by JRR Tolkien

Middle-earth books
05
1987 books
Unfinished books
History of Middle-earth Vol V: Lost Road and Other Writings, The
Books published posthumously